"London's Brilliant" is a song by former Transvision Vamp lead singer Wendy James. It was released in 1993 as the second single from her debut solo album Now Ain't the Time for Your Tears and was written by Elvis Costello and his then wife Cait O'Riordan. The single was unsuccessful upon release, peaking at a low number sixty-two on the UK Singles Chart.

Costello released his demo of the song on one version of his 1994 EP for "London's Brilliant Parade". Costello asserted that the similarity in title between the songs did not mean they were connected: "It just has the coincidence of a similar title."

Track listing
CD single/Maxi single
"London's Brilliant" – 2:29
"My Ballad To 46th Street" – 3:15 (Wendy James/Neil Taylor)
"I Will Never Be Your Lover" – 4:48 (James/Taylor)

12" single
"London's Brilliant" – 2:29
"To All Beginnings" (James/Taylor)
"My Ballad to 46th Street" – 3:15

Charts

References

1993 singles
Songs written by Elvis Costello
Song recordings produced by Chris Kimsey
1993 songs
MCA Records singles